Alexander Obiefoka Enukora Animalu (born 28 August 1938) is a Nigerian academic, who is Professor Emeritus of Physics at the University of Nigeria, Nsukka.

He holds a BSc (London), M.A. (Cantab.) and PhD (Ibadan), FAS, NNOM, IOM

A pioneer of solar energy in Nigeria, Animalu is a physicist of international repute, member of the highest advisory body on Science and Technology to the Nigerian government, Honorary Presidential Advisory Council on Science and Technology (2001–03) and former Director National Mathematical Centre, Abuja.

Biography
He was born on 28 August 1938, the fifth child to Michael Animalu Nwakudu and Josephine Nkenwa in Okuzu, Oba of Idemili South L.G.A. of Anambra State of Nigeria, and attended St. Paul's CMS Church School, Isu-Oba (1943–44); St. Thomas's CMS Church School, Okuzu (1944–45), CMS Central School, Isu-Oba (1945–51), Dennis Memorial Grammar School (1952–56) for secondary education and (1957–58) for Higher School Certificate. He then attended University College, Ibadan (1959–62), where he was taught by Professor Chike Obi and Professor James Ezeilo.

Early career

Later career in Nigeria
He was invited to become a professor of physics in 1976 in the Department of Physics and Astronomy, University of Nigeria, Nsukka by his former lecturer and the then Vice-Chancellor of the university, Professor Emeritus James Ezeilo. The former Nigerian President, Chief Olusegun Obasanjo, presented him with the Nigerian National Order of Merit (NNOM) award for Basic Science in 2000. He rose in academic positions becoming Head of Department of Physics, UNN in 1981 and 1994 and Dean, Faculty of the Physical Sciences, UNN. His proposal to the Federal Government of Nigeria led to the establishment of a Centre for Energy Research and Development in the UNN in 1980. He became the first substantive Chairman of its Governing Board in 1989.  The idea for a National Mathematical Center in Nigeria was hatched by Professor Emeritus Ezeilo and Animalu. He was the 1990 Ahiajoku lecturer, the highest Igbo academic privilege given to such scholars as Professor Chinua Achebe and Professor Onwumechili.

With Willy Umezinwa he co-authored the 1968 book Asp, From African Symbols to Physics'. Animalu has more than 100 scholarly articles to his credit.

He was honoured with the position of Emeritus Professor of the University of Nigeria in 2006. He is also chairman/CEO, Institute for Basic Research (Nigeria Division) and a Knight of St. Christopher (KSC).

Research profile

Google Scholar citations
"Animalu's Google Scholar Citations"

ResearchGate profile
"Animalu's ResearchGate Profile"

References

Living people
Nigerian physicists
1938 births
Alumni of the University of Cambridge
Missouri University of Science and Technology faculty
Drexel University faculty
Fellows of the Nigerian Academy of Science
Academic staff of the University of Nigeria
Nigerian expatriate academics in the United States
Recipients of the Nigerian National Order of Merit Award
Nigerian expatriates in the United Kingdom